This is a list of broadcast television stations that are licensed in the U.S. state of Wisconsin.

Full-power stations
VC refers to the station's PSIP virtual channel. RF refers to the station's physical RF channel.

Defunct full-power stations
 Channel 25: WCAN-TV - CBS - Milwaukee (9/5/1953-2/27/1955)
 Channel 34: KFIZ-TV - Ind. - Fond du Lac (12/16/1968-11/19/1972)
 Channel 42: WNAM-TV - ABC - Neenah/Appleton/Menasha (12/10/1953-1/2/1955)
 Channel 48: WOSH-TV - ABC - Oshkosh (7/1/1953-3/23/1954)
 Channel 55: WFXS-TV - Fox - Wittenberg (12/1/1999- 7/1/2015)

LPTV stations

Translators

References

External links
 Wisconsin TV stations (source of above)
 FCCData.org
 TvRadioWorld - Wisconsin
 MilwaukeeHDTV.org - Website for HDTV in Milwaukee, WI

Wisconsin
 
Television stations